Bilinga is a southern coastal suburb in the City of Gold Coast, Queensland, Australia. It is on the border with New South Wales.

Geography
Bilinga is bounded by Boyd Street to the north-west, the Coral Sea to the east, and the border with New South Wales to the west.

The entire eastern coastline of the suburb is a continuous sandy surf beach, with the northern end known as Bilinga Beach and the southern end known as North Kirra Beach. Immediately inland from the beach is a narrow strip of housing (the only residential part of the suburb).

Gold Coast Airport (formerly the Coolangatta Airport) occupies the majority of the suburb, extending across the border into Tweed Heads West in New South Wales.

The Gold Coast Desalination Plant is in the north-west of the suburb.

The Gold Coast campus of the Southern Cross University (headquartered in Lismore, New South Wales) is in the south of the suburb.

The Gold Coast Highway enters the suburb from the north (Tugun) and mostly separating the residential ara from the airport and other infrastructure before exiting to the south (Tweed Heads West / Tweed Heads) towards the Pacific Motorway.

History
The word "Bilinga" is derived from the word "Bilinba", meaning bats. The name was adopted in 1918 as a place name for Crown lands north of Coolangatta.

In February 1908, 5 land portions were advertised to be open for selection as agricultural farms and unconditional selections by the Department of Public Lands office. The map advertising the selection, surveyed by J.H.Jensen, shows the portions 84 to 88 situated between the South Coast railway line in the north and the tick fence to the south.

After the land sales, a rail siding was created in 1919. It was located roughly an the intersection of the Gold Coast Highway and George Street.

After 1919, the catalyst for an increase in development was said to be the erection of a general store, owned by businessman Percy Hanzel, near the rail siding. Furthermore, increased development could be attributed to a new coastal road, which improved access to the area for holiday makers and residents.

The drowning of a man on Bilinga Beach in 1937 led to the establishment of the Bilinga Surf Lifesaving Club in 1938.

In 1989, Bilinga received 50,000 cubic metres of sand as part of a beach nourishment program.

The median age of the Bilinga population was 47 years, 9 years above the national median of 38.  66.8% of people were born in Australia and 78.2% of people spoke only English at home. The most common responses for religion were No Religion 27.5% and Catholic 21.5%.

During 2020 and 2021, the Queensland borders were closed to most people due to the COVID-19 pandemic. Border crossing points were either closed or had a Queensland Police checkpoint to allow entry to only those people with an appropriate permit. The Gold Coast Highway at Bilinga was one of the police border checkpoints.

Education 
There are no schools in Bilinga. The nearest primary school is Coolangatta State School in neighbouring Coolangatta to the south-east. The nearest secondary school is Palm Beach Currumbin State High School in Palm Beach to the north-west.

The Gold Coast campus of Southern Cross University offers a range of courses in arts, health, social science, business, education, information technology, law and tourism. The university is a partner with the Gold Coast airport and other tourism-oriented businesses to offer specialised degrees and research in aviation and tourism.

Community groups
Bilinga Surf Life Saving Club members patrol the beach on weekends and public holidays from September to May each year. Their clubhouse is at 257 Golden Four Drive facing the beach.

North Kirra Surf Life Saving Club has their clubhouse at 41 Pacific Parade on the foreshore.

Notable people
Notable people from Bilinga include:
 Gregory Shambrook (born 1953), a rugby union player, represented Australia

See also

 Suburbs of the Gold Coast

References

 Gresty, J.A., The Numinbah Valley: Its Geography, History and Aboriginal Associations 
 Watson, F.E Vocabularies of Four Representative Tribes of South East Queensland
 Kerr, John. Destination South Brisbane, p. 45

External links

 
 Bilinga Surf Life Saving Club

Suburbs of the Gold Coast, Queensland
Coastline of Queensland